Gulzar is a village of Mardan District in the Khyber Pakhtunkhwa province of Pakistan. It is located at 34°13'0N 72°6'25E lying to the north-east of the district capital Mardan - with an altitude of 293 metres (964 feet).

References

Populated places in Mardan District